The Irish Commemorative Stone (also known as the Black Rock) is a monument in Pointe-Saint-Charles, island of Montreal, Quebec commemorating the deaths from "ship fever" (typhoid) of 6,000 mostly Irish immigrants to Canada during the immigration following the Great Irish Famine in 1847-48. It is a 30-tonne, 10-foot high boulder.

Officially named the Irish Commemorative Stone, it is more commonly known as the Black Rock and also has been referred to as the Ship Fever Monument or the Boulder Stone.

History

During the mid-19th century, workers constructing the Victoria Bridge across the St. Lawrence River discovered a mass grave in Windmill Point where victims of the typhus epidemic of 1847 had been quarantined in fever sheds. The workers, many of whom were of Irish descent, were unsettled by the discovery and wanted to create a memorial to ensure the grave, which held the coffins of 6,000 Irish immigrants, would not be forgotten.
Erected on December 1, 1859, the stone was the first Canadian monument to represent the famine.  The inscription on the stone reads:

"To Preserve from Desecration the Remains of 6000 Immigrants Who died of Ship Fever A.D. 1847-48
This Stone is erected by the Workmen of Messrs. Peto, Brassey and Betts Employed in the Construction of the Victoria Bridge A.D.
1859"

Located in the median of Bridge St., at approximately 45°29'12.3"N 73°32'46.6"W. Google maps have blurred out the inscription at a close distance but it still can be seen at a distance. On ACME Mapper the location is written N 45.48683 W 73.54638.

About 75,000 Irish people are believed to have emigrated to Canada during the famine.  The official figures (from "the Report of a committee of the Honourable the Executive Council on matters of State"), gave the figures of 5,293 deaths at sea, and "Dr. Douglas, the medical Superintendent of Grosse Isle, estimated that 8,000 died at sea in 1847."   However, the Montreal Gazette reported in 1934 that 18,000 Irish men, women and children died on the trip to Canada.

Social significance
The Black Rock  continues to be a significant icon, particularly within the Montreal Irish community led by the Ancient Order of Hibernians Canada.  Each year at the end of May, the Canadian Irish community hosts a walk from St. Gabriel's church in Pointe St. Charles to the stone to commemorate those lives that were lost. It is also a portal in the reality based phone app Ingress Prime.

See also
 Ireland Park

Notes

References 
 Gallagher, The Reverend John A. (1936) "The Irish Emigration of 1847 and Its Canadian Consequences" CCHA Report, University of Manitoba Web site. Retrieved February 7, 2011.

External links 
 Montreal Irish walk in remembrance of coffin ship victims Irish Central, July 23, 2009.

Irish-Canadian culture in Montreal
Monuments and memorials in Montreal
Irish emigrants to Canada (before 1923)
Great Famine (Ireland) monuments and memorials
Le Sud-Ouest
Epidemic typhus
Stone monuments and memorials
Epidemic monuments and memorials